International Academy of St. Petersburg Russia is an international school located in St. Petersburg, Russia. Its curriculum and structure is based on the international American standards and is directed towards students who plan to attend a college/university in the U.S., Europe, and Asia. For this reason all of its classes are conducted in English and the school confers an internationally recognized diploma.  IA is accredited through the Association of Christian Schools International (ACSI) and Middle States Association.

History and Campus
International Academy began in 1993 as a school for the expatriate community in St. Petersburg, Russia.

Academics
The average class size is around 10 students for the elementary grades, 7 for middle school, and 5 for high school. Students receive individual attention in a safe, nurturing environment. Enrollment fluctuates year to year but has been around 80-100 for the past several years.

Athletics
International Academy's mascot is the "Guardians."

Activities
Depending on the interests of staff and parent volunteers, activities vary year to year. Current activities are as follows:
- Cross country running
- Basketball
- Choir
- Musical
- Yearbook
- Model UN
- After School Program

See also
 List of higher education and academic institutions in Saint Petersburg

References
International Academy of St. Petersburg website

External links
 Official Website

International schools in Saint Petersburg
Educational institutions established in 1993
1993 establishments in Russia